Hon. William Moore ( – 1 April 1732) was an Irish politician. He sat in the Irish House of Commons from 1715 to 1727 as a Member of Parliament (MP) for the borough of Ardee in County Louth.

He was the fifth son of Henry Hamilton-Moore, 3rd Earl of Drogheda.

References 

Year of birth uncertain
1685 births
1732 deaths
Irish MPs 1715–1727
Members of the Parliament of Ireland (pre-1801) for County Louth constituencies
Younger sons of earls